Great Mall station (formerly known as Great Mall/Main Transit Center) is operated by Santa Clara Valley Transportation Authority (VTA). This station is served by the Orange Line of the VTA Light Rail system. The station is elevated over the intersection of Great Mall Parkway and Main Street in Milpitas, California. A pedestrian bridge connects the Light Rail station to the Great Mall of the Bay Area.

The station was opened on June 24, 2004, as part of the second phase of VTA's Tasman East light rail extension.

This station formerly served as a major transfer point between VTA Light Rail and bus lines. The transit center was closed and the majority of the bus lines moved to the nearby Milpitas station which opened on December 28, 2019.

Service

Station layout

References

External links 

Great Mall Station – VTA

Santa Clara Valley Transportation Authority light rail stations
Santa Clara Valley Transportation Authority bus stations
Buildings and structures in Milpitas, California
Railway stations in the United States opened in 2004
2004 establishments in California